The Abu Dhabi Investment Office (ADIO) was launched with the objective of helping investors and companies of all sizes establish, grow and develop their business in the Emirate of Abu Dhabi.

As the central government hub supporting investment in Abu Dhabi, ADIO is responsible for helping the emirate’s private sector grow and diversify its economy.

History 
ADIO, an independent authority, was established by Law No.1 of 2019, issued by the UAE President, His Highness Sheikh Khalifa bin Zayed Al Nahyan.

The office is responsible for implementing a strategy to increase foreign direct investment in Abu Dhabi by supporting investors and companies looking to establish or expand in Abu Dhabi.

In January 2021, ADIO announced the opening of eight international offices in Tel Aviv, New York, San Francisco, Frankfurt, London, Paris, Beijing and Seoul, in an effort to attract global investors to the emirate.

ADIO’s international offices provide localised support and facilitate connections between companies in their respective markets and Abu Dhabi.

Approach 
ADIO offers tailored and personalised investor care, guidance and support for investing in Abu Dhabi, coupled with structured financial and non-financial incentives. The office identifies investment opportunities for businesses and investors across the Abu Dhabi ecosystem.

Services 
ADIO offers the following services for businesses of all sizes across the emirate:

 Data: providing information on the economy and all aspects of doing business in Abu Dhabi
 Networks: connecting companies to the Abu Dhabi business ecosystem
 Licensing and permits: providing insight into laws and regulations, in addition to offering assistance with licences and operating permits
 Real estate: identifying cost-effective solutions for office space and industrial activities
 Talent and visas: helping investors connect with local talent and obtain visas for employees
 Banking and finance: introducing investors to local banking partners and expediting bank account setup

ADIO also established an Investor Care team to collaborate with investors across all stages of their investment journey in Abu Dhabi.

Innovation Programme 
ADIO’s Innovation Programme provides incentives to a wide range of businesses in high-growth areas, including Financial Services, Tourism, AgTech, ICT, and Healthcare & Biopharma, among others.

The Innovation Programme includes globally competitive financial and non-financial incentives worth AED 2 billion ($545 million), providing support to innovative businesses.

ADIO has partnered with 18 companies under the Innovation Programme. Examples include: financial services company, Peninsula Real Estate; enterprise software firm, Eureka; financial services firm, Florin Court Capital; infrastructure advisory and investment firm, Tribe Infrastructure Group; and vertical farming group, AeroFarms.

Key sectors

Tourism 
With over 11 million annual visitors, tourism is one of Abu Dhabi’s primary sectors. The Emirate’s tourism sector is forecasted to grow annually by more than 5% over the next decade.

Healthcare and Biopharma 
Significant government investment in the healthcare industry has helped to establish advanced medical care and research facilities across Abu Dhabi.

Over the past decade, there has been a marked increase in the number of health centres and clinics in the emirate, including Cleveland Clinic — operated by Mubadala Healthcare — and Tawam Hospital, operated by Johns Hopkins University in Al Ain.

ADIO has established several partnerships to bring advanced healthcare technologies, best practices and world-class standards to the Abu Dhabi community. These include partnerships with Plug and Play and Okadoc.

ICT 
According to the Telecommunications and Digital Government Regulatory Authority (TRA), there were approximately 2.3 million fixed lines in operation in the UAE, with 18.9 million active mobile subscribers (216% penetration) and 3.2 million broadband internet subscribers (2020).

Abu Dhabi was the first capital city in the world to achieve 100% fibre-to-home broadband connectivity and is considered the smartest city in the MENA region (IMD Smart City Index 2021).

The emirate’s ICT sector continues to grow with the support of bodies and organisations such as the Abu Dhabi Digital Authority (ADDA) and telecom leader Etisalat; as well as  private sector players, including Anghami, Bespin Global, STARZPLAY, Lyve, Callsign and Rizek.

In partnership with ADIO, Amazon Web Services (AWS) launched a cloud infrastructure region in the UAE. Amazon is set to open its state-of-the-art fulfilment centre in Abu Dhabi by 2024.

AgTech 
Owing to the growing presence of agricultural businesses and organisations in Abu Dhabi, AgTech has also become one of the emirate’s leading sectors.

ADIO has established partnerships with AgTech companies such as Pure Harvest, FreshTohome, Aerofarms and Nanoracks, to increase local AgTech capabilities for food production.

Energy 
Energy production has become one of Abu Dhabi’s main areas of focus. Ongoing programmes have been launched in the emirate — for example, by the Abu Dhabi National Oil Company (ADNOC), Masdar and others — to help develop clean and renewable projects facilitating a transition to sustainable energy solutions.

As part of Abu Dhabi’s drive to develop clean energy and carbon capture technologies, large-scale solar and nuclear projects are set to come online in the coming years to address the growing demand for energy.

Media 
Abu Dhabi’s media sector has grown over the years as a result of the emirate’s production facilities, government incentives, infrastructure and partnerships with international media players.

The media sector is supported by twofour54, Abu Dhabi's media free zone, that provides facilities, technology and innovation in aid of local, regional and international media expansion.

Abu Dhabi aims to attract more existing and new media companies by offering access to a global talent pool, a fast-paced ecosystem and local and regional markets.

Logistics 
Abu Dhabi plays a central role in global trade and transportation. Two-third of the world’s population can be reached within an eight-hour flight of Abu Dhabi. The Khalifa Port is the region’s first semi-automated container port and is served by major shipping lines providing global logistical connectivity.

The port is part of KIZAD (Khalifa Industrial Zone Abu Dhabi), Abu Dhabi’s integrated trade, logistics and industrial hub. KIZAD offers a tax-free environment in a designated free zone, as well as mainland industrial zone solutions, competitive operating costs and multi-modal connectivity.

New projects established to improve the emirate’s ground infrastructure, including light rail, metro, ferries, railroad and a commercial high-speed hyperloop system, are underway in Abu Dhabi.

Education 
Abu Dhabi is home to a broad range of educational institutions and facilities. Many local universities have expanded while other internationally recognised institutions have established campuses in Abu Dhabi, such as Sorbonne, INSEAD and New York University Abu Dhabi (NYUAD).

Financial Services 
Abu Dhabi is home to the award-winning international financial centre – Abu Dhabi Global Market (ADGM). In 2020, it was accorded the ‘Best International Financial Centre EMEA’ by the London-based Capital Finance International for second consecutive year.

ADGM is an independent jurisdiction that enables registered financial and non-financial entities to operate within an international regulatory framework based on English Common Law.

The most notable organisations in the emirate’s financial services sector include the Abu Dhabi Investment Authority (ADIA), First Abu Dhabi Bank (FAB) — the second-largest bank in the Middle East — and the Abu Dhabi Securities Exchange (ADX).

Infrastructure partnerships 
ADIO has helped to launch partnerships between the public and private sectors on infrastructure projects.

These partnerships create private sector opportunities while contributing to Abu Dhabi’s economic development. They are a key factor in the emirate’s growth.

Public-private partnerships (PPPs) projects 
A number of public-private partnership (PPP) initiatives have been launched in Abu Dhabi.

In 2019, a new law regulating PPPs (Law No.2) was introduced appointing ADIO as the central government authority responsible for administering PPPs, to encourage the long-term involvement of the private sector in major infrastructure projects in the emirate.

ADIO works with government entities across Abu Dhabi to facilitate PPPs, as part of the government’s plan to procure approximately AED 10 billion ($2.7 billion) worth of infrastructure partnership projects in the immediate term.

Musataha projects 
A Musataha agreement creates a real property right, entitling the holder to construct a building or to invest in and develop a project on land belonging to a third party for a period of up to 50 years.

ADIO issued the form of Musataha agreement in 2020 to be used in connection with government lands, to enable private sector investors opportunities to deliver long-term projects in Abu Dhabi, including the development of land owned by the government.

The Musataha agreement maximises benefits for both the private and public sectors, including the implementation of a highly competitive pricing model with flexible and attractive terms for companies looking to grow in the emirate.

In July 2021, ADIO announced the procurement of 12 new community market projects in Abu Dhabi and Al Ain via Musataha tenders.

Senior management 
 H.E. Mohammed Ali Al Shorafa, Chairman, Abu Dhabi Department of Economic Development (ADDED)

References

External links 
Official website

Investment promotion agencies
Economy of the Emirate of Abu Dhabi
Government agencies of Abu Dhabi